San Cristoforo is a small, Roman Catholic church located at the intersection of Via San Niccolò and Via dell’Orto della Cera, in central Cortona, Province of Arezzo, region of Tuscany in Italy.

History
Documents date a church at the site from 1192, but much of the church was rebuilt in 1575 after a fire, and modified over the centuries. The rustic facade is awkwardly place relative to the nave. In the apse, some 14th-century frescoes still survive, depicting the Crucifixion, the Annunciation, the Ascension, and Christ blessing with Angels. The brick roof structure that  holds the bells was built in the 15th century. The interior contains a restored 19th-century organ by Giovanni Banci.

References

Romanesque architecture in Tuscany
Roman Catholic churches in Cortona
12th-century Roman Catholic church buildings in Italy